Mechanics of Dominion is the sixth studio album by Canadian band Esmerine. It was released on October 20, 2017 through Constellation Records.

Track listing

References

2017 albums
Esmerine albums
Constellation Records (Canada) albums